Below is the list of articles related to Crimean Tatars

History and ethnogenesis
Crimean Karaites - Crimean Khanate - Crimean People's Republic - Crimean Tatar diaspora - Crimean Tatar language - Crimean Tatar dialects - Crimean Tatars - Cumania - Golden Horde - Kipchak people - Krymchaks - Lipka Tatars - Mongol Empire - Nogay - Tatars

Geography 

Aqmescit - Aqyar - Azov - Azov Sea - Bağçasaray - Çufut Qale - Gözleve - Karasubazar - Kefe - Hansaray - Or Qapı - Taurida Governorate

People

Amet-khan Sultan - Refat Appazov - Ismail Bulatov - Noman Çelebicihan - Emir Chalbash - Bekir Çoban-zade - Mustafa Dzhemilev - Ismail Gaspıralı - Jamala - Kenan Kutub-zade - Mansur Mazinov - Musa Mamut - Yuri Osmanov - Abdraim Reshidov - Ayshe Seitmuratova - Seit Tairov

Exile and politics
Deportation of the Crimean Tatars - Self-immolation - Ukaz 493 - Mubarek zone - Letter of Seventeen - Mejilis - ATR - Crimean ASSR - Detatarization of Crimea - Tatarophobia - Annexation of Crimea - UDTTMR
Crimean Tatars
Crimean Tatars